Omali Yeshitela (born Joseph Waller on October 9, 1941) is an African revolutionary, political leader, theoretician and author. He is the founder and chairman of the African People's Socialist Party, which leads the Uhuru Movement.

According to its Constitution, the African People's Socialist Party is the "advanced detachment of the African working class and its general staff," pursuing the goal of "the liberation and unification of Africa and African people under the leadership of the African working class as a critical component of the struggle to overthrow imperialism."

Yeshitela is the founder of The Burning Spear newspaper, the official journal of the African People's Socialist Party which has been in publication since 1968. Yeshitela is a writer and theoretician recognized for creating the revolutionary political theory known as "African Internationalism."

Yeshitela is credited with popularizing the demand for reparations to African people in the U.S. and worldwide, having served as the People's Advocate at the First International Tribunal on Reparations to Black People in the U.S., held in Brooklyn, NY in 1982. He is the author of numerous books and pamphlets including Vanguard: Advanced Detachment of the African Revolution and An Uneasy Equilibrium: The African Revolution versus Parasitic Capitalism.

Early background
Omali Yeshitela was born Joseph Waller, Jr. in St. Petersburg, Florida on October 9, 1941.  Yeshitela was raised in a community formerly known as the Gas Plant Area, an African community on the South Side of St. Petersburg, Florida.  The Gas Plant Area no longer exists, as it was razed to create Tropicana Field, home of the Tampa Bay Rays. Yeshitela attended Jordan Elementary School, Sixteenth Street Junior High School, and Gibbs High School as a youth.

Yeshitela belongs to what historian Donna Murch calls "the Black Power Generation", black working class activists who came of age between the 1955 lynching of Emmett Till and the 1965 assassination of Malcolm X.  Yeshitela is less than two months younger than Till and was 13 years old when the 14-year-old Till was lynched in Drew, Mississippi on August 28, 1955.  Yeshitela has noted that the lynching of Till impacted his worldview, and the worldview of Black People in the United States.

US Army Years 
In the late 1950s, the Modern Civil Rights Movement and African decolonization struggles were advancing.  All sectors of black society discussed these topics.  Yeshitela was a standout student at Gibbs High School.  In 1959, during his senior year at Gibbs High School, a class discussion was held on "the advancement of African people."  In  this discussion, a teacher declared that black people would have to "prove" themselves to white people if they wanted to be free.  That is when Yeshitela decided to leave school and join the United States Army.

Yeshitela completed his basic training in South Carolina.  He was subsequently stationed in Germany.  Yeshitela has noted that it was in Germany where he began to learn about imperialism.  "As a U.S. soldier in Berlin, which was also occupied militarily by British troops, I was subjected to lectures by white British officers who told humiliating, "racist" stories of the colonial war being waged against our people in Congo who, under the leadership of Patrice Lumumba, were fighting to overturn colonial domination by the Belgians and other colonialists, including the British and U.S.," Yeshitela writes.

In the army, Yeshitela was able to connect imperialism and colonialism to his treatment as an African person in the United States.  While in a military convoy to South Florida, during the Cuban Missile Crisis, a white restaurant owner was allowed to deny Yeshitela service because Yeshitela was black.  In Fort Benning, Georgia, Yeshitela was accused of attempting to hold the hand of a white woman at a snack bar because he refused to drop money in her hand (a common practice that prevented white people from having to touch the skin of black people).  In protest of the colonial policy of the United States, Yeshitela wrote a 12-page letter to US President John F. Kennedy declaring his inability to serve in an army "that protected the likes of George Wallace and a tradition of oppression of African people."

Yeshitela notes that he "went on strike" and basically quit the army.  Yeshitela began a leafleting campaign that opposed the conditions of African people in the US and in the US military.  The army sent Yeshitela to a psychiatrist.  The psychiatrist declared that nothing was wrong with him, "You're just a Garveyite" which was a reference to Marcus Garvey and his early 20th century movement for African self-determination.  The army subsequently attempted to court-martial Yeshitela.  Yeshitela defended himself in the court-martial and won.  He received an honorable discharge from the army days later.  Yeshitela became an active member in the Civil Rights Movement and budding Black Power Movement upon his return to Central Florida.

Entry into the Civil Rights Movement and the Black Power Movement 
Yeshitela returned to St. Petersburg, Florida following his discharge from the US Army.  He worked in many fields such as manual labor in a carpet sales and installation warehouse, and as a "copy boy", a proofreader and an apprentice printer for the St. Petersburg Times.  Yeshitela also attended Gibbs Junior College.  Yeshitela became involved with other college students who organized against the Jim Crow policies in St. Petersburg, Florida.

Yeshitela explored a variety of movements and organizations.  Yeshitela attended meetings and participated in some actions led by the National Association for the Advancement of Colored People (NAACP) but did not agree with their tactics and objectives.  Yeshitela explored the Nation of Islam because of his love for Malcolm X but did not choose to join them.  Yeshitela became associated with the Congress of Racial Equality (CORE).  Yeshitela was an organizer for a voter registration and education project in African communities of North Florida.  Following his work with CORE, Yeshitela joined the Student Nonviolent Coordinating Committee.

Student Nonviolent Coordinating Committee 
Yeshitela participated in the Civil Rights Movement in his youth during the 1950s and 1960s as a member of the Student Nonviolent Coordinating Committee.  SNCC was an important organization.  Formed in 1960, SNCC departed from the politics of the Southern Christian Leadership Conference (SCLC).  SNCC began in 1960.  Since 1960, SNCC had committed itself to organizing amongst the grassroots in the South.  SNCC had also begun to develop relationships internationally.  SNCC organizers had met Ahmed Sekou Toure of Guinea and other African Independence leaders.  SNCC had formed a close relationship with Malcolm X.

Yeshitela joined SNCC in 1966.  This was the same year that Stokely Carmichael (later known as Kwame Ture) was elected the chair of SNCC.  Yeshitela notes that Carmichael had "captured the imagination of the world when he uttered the slogan/demand" Black Power.  SNCC had also organized the Lowndes County Freedom Organization in Alabama.

In 1966, Omali Yeshitela organized the first membership-based  SNCC chapter.  SNCC had originally been operated as a staff-based volunteer organization.  The membership-based structure gave the SNCC chapter in St. Petersburg, Florida, the same character as the Black Panther Party for Self-Defense, forming around the same time in Oakland, California.

SNCC organized in the defense of the African Community in St. Petersburg, Florida (as they had done elsewhere).  Omali Yeshitela notes that one issue they had been concerned with was a $50 million federal grant to the city of St. Petersburg which the city government had chosen to “beautify” downtown St. Petersburg.  Yeshitela and SNCC believed that the funding would be better used to provide jobs, economic development and other improvements to the black community in St. Petersburg.  Yeshitela notes that the struggle over economic development was the important backdrop to Yeshitela’s famous tearing down of George Snow Hill’s racist mural that hung in St. Petersburg City Hall.

Tearing down of the Racist City Hall Mural 
Yeshitela had intervened into radical thought with his differentiation between colonialism and racism.  Yeshitela notes that “racism is simply the ideological foundation of capitalist imperialism.”  Yeshitela goes on to state that “the bourgeois ideology of ‘racism’ serves to unite the vast majority of whites and even some Africans in support of the imperialist agenda.”  This offers context to the mural incident.

SNCC St. Petersburg had organized a demonstration and press conference at St. Petersburg City Hall at noontime on December 29, 1966.  The purpose of the demonstration was to utilize the issue of the mural “to galvanize public opinion to effect the changes” that SNCC had been pursuing.  The degrading mural reflected the minstrel culture that was popular throughout American media during the height of Jim Crow.  George Snow Hill’s “Picnicking at the Pass-a-Grille” was one of two images that had been displayed in St. Petersburg City Hall since 1945.  “Picnicking at the Pass-a-Grille” depicted blackface musicians with exaggerated features and white paint around their mouths entertaining white beach goers.  Its companion piece entitled “Fishing at the Pier” depicted white families with normal features enjoying a relaxing day of fishing.  Bill DeYoung, a former correspondent with the St. Petersburg Times noted that these murals were suggested to represent “everyday life in St. Petersburg.”  The black community had opposed the mural for two decades, since its installation.  For the African community of St. Petersburg, “The mural bitterly represented the place that colonized black people were relegated to in this city, where African people were forced to function as oppressed servants to the white tourist industry and elderly white retirees.”  As well, “The offensive mural represented a city where African people for decades were confined to housing in a small, two-mile square area of south St. Petersburg that was subjected to a curfew after 9 p.m. every night.”

Herman Goldner, the Mayor of St. Petersburg rejected the demands made by Yeshitela and SNCC stating, “our minorities had to learn to be less sensitive.”  Goldner also stated: "I find nothing offensive in the portrayal of strolling troubadours and picnickers at Pass-a-Grille Beach.... I think you know that I, personally, am not a racist. I think... that all of our minority groups must mature to the point where self-consciousness is not a motivating factor for complaints."

Yeshitela and the SNCC activists did not intend on tearing down the mural.  The mural incident was prompted by white reporters and cops laughing at an older African woman who spoke at the December 29, 1966 demonstration at St. Petersburg City Hall.  The poor and elderly woman had joined the protest march when it passed her house.  She spoke of the exploitative insurance that the African working class had to endure in St. Petersburg, Florida.  Yeshitela writes that the elderly woman “spoke ‘broken English,’ used double negatives and split infinitives, and the media and police personnel found her funny, treating her like entertainment.”  Yeshitela immediately marched into city hall and ripped down the 7 X 10 foot mural.  The incident hit the news wire and was covered by a variety of media sources throughout the United States including Jet Magazine which covered the incident in a two page spread.

Yeshitela was sentenced to five years in state prison for the mural incident.  While in prison, Omali Yeshitela organized the Junta of Militant Organizations (JOMO).

Founding of the Junta of Militant Organizations (JOMO) 
The Junta of Militant Organizations (JOMO) was formed in St. Petersburg, Florida in May 1968.  JOMO emerged in the wake of assassination of Dr. Martin Luther King, Jr. in Memphis Tennessee on April 4, 1968 and Little Bobby Hutton, the youngest member of the Black Panther Party, in Oakland, California on April 6, 1968.  This was also the period of the St. Petersburg Sanitation Workers Strike. Omali Yeshitela created JOMO while he was incarcerated, serving time for the December 1966 mural incident.  In Spanish, junta means council.  As well, the letters were chosen because they spelled out the first name of Jomo Kenyatta.  At that time, Kenyatta was thought to be responsible for the Kenya Land and Freedom Army, popularly known as the Mau Mau.  Yeshitela notes: "Despite the erroneous understanding of who the neocolonialist Jomo Kenyatta was, Africa was clearly on my mind as central to our identity as a people and the starting point for understanding our situation in the U.S. and the world. The Swahili word for freedom, 'Uhuru,' introduced to the political lexicon of the world by the Mau Mau, became my lodestar."

JOMO became the leading anti-colonial African revolutionary organization in Florida. JOMO also developed a strong presence in other parts of the US South, including Louisville, Kentucky. 

JOMO represented a form of mass movement organizing that subsequent organizations within the Uhuru Movement embraced in the years to come.  In 1968, JOMO founded The Burning Spear Newspaper, the oldest Black Power newspaper in continuous print.  In 1969, JOMO formed the JOMO Blood Bank at St. Anthony’s Hospital in St. Petersburg, Florida.  The blood bank was created “because of the high price of blood and the vicious nature of America's capitalistic hospitals” with a pint of blood costing Africans as much as $45; which is around $300 2022.  On 1 January 1970, the blood bank released 14 pints of blood to two African women saving them $600 (about $4,000 today).

JOMO's put forward the following seven demands in defense of the African community:

 Control of our schools – – – the curriculum, the hiring and firing and the determination of how much money is to be allotted to the schools.
 A Police review board composed of a broad section of the Black community.
 An end to exploitation by white merchants who have businesses in the ghetto.
 Control of all Black public housing.
 All slumlords having rental property in the Black community be forced to turn that property over to the city which will take the rent in escrow and turn the property over to the occupants after a designated period of time.
 The lines of our districts be redrawn so the area where Black people are a majority will constitute a district, giving Black people the power to elect Black local representation who will not have to depend on the white vote for election.
 Complete control of the Black community.
As a mass organization, the membership of JOMO was broad and its impact was wide.  Many years later, Geronimo Pratt, for example, told Chairman Omali Yeshitela that he had been a member of JOMO in the late 1960s when he was stationed in Florida.  In 1972, JOMO joined with two other Florida organizations, the Black Rights Fighters of Fort Myers and the Black Study Group of Gainesville, to create the African People’s Socialist Party.

Founding of The Burning Spear Newspaper 
The Burning Spear Newspaper is the oldest institution of the Uhuru Movement and predates the formation of the African People's Socialist Party.  The Burning Spear  was formed in December 1968, on the second anniversary of the city hall mural incident, in St. Petersburg, Florida.  The original Burning Spear was an 8x11mimeographed 4-page newsletter.  In December 1969, The Burning Spear became a typeset newspaper.

Yeshitela served as the first editor of the newspaper.  The Burning Spear was first produced by the Junta of Militant Organizations (JOMO), the organization that Yeshitela formed in 1968.  The title of the newspaper reflects translation of the name JOMO. Jomo means "burning spear" in the Kikuyu language.  As with the adoption of the slogan-demand “Uhuru,” title of the newspaper intended to connect the Uhuru Movement in the US to the Kenya Land and Freedom Army of Dedan Kimathi, commonly known as the Mau Mau.

Omali Yeshitela explained The Burning Spear Newspaper and its outgrowth from the Black Power Movement:  "The Burning Spear was born out of struggle: out of the burning contradictions of the 60s that resulted in the Black Power Movement, and the reactions beatings, jailings, and murders by various US law officials.  From the beginning, the Burning Spear was an attempt to place our struggle in focus for our people and our allies."

Omali Yeshitela has described The Burning Spear as a dual and contending power institution.  Yeshitela explained this at the 1985 forum "Does the Media Tell the Truth?" held in Berkeley, California:  "We don't consider ourselves alternative media.  We consider ourselves a contending force."  He later went on to explain, "[W]e see ourselves in fierce contention with the media."  The cover of the December 1969 Burning Spear depicted the Snow Hill mural that Yeshitela tore down three years earlier.

The Burning Spear gained broad circulation throughout the United States and globally.  Bakari Olatunji, a longtime member of the APSP and an Oakland resident has noted that newspaper was even distributed by members of the Black Panther Party in Oakland, alongside their own newspaper. In the 1980s, Omali Yeshitela encountered a white British man in a black bookstore, standing in the middle of the floor, with The Burning Spear  in hand, extolling the virtue of the newspaper as an honest purveyor of the truth. The newspaper also praises Russia and fully supports Vladimir Putin's invasion of Ukraine, calling it a defensive operation.

Founding of the African People's Socialist Party 
Yeshitela co-founded the African People's Socialist Party in May 1972 through the fusion of three Florida-based organizations: the Junta of Militant Organizations (JOMO), based in St. Petersburg, Florida, led by Yeshitela, the Black Rights Fighters based in Ft. Myers, Florida, led by Lawrence Mann, and the Black Study Group based in Gainesville, Florida, led by Katura Carey. That same year, the APSP adopted JOMO's newspaper The Burning Spear – the longest-running Black Power newspaper in the U.S. – as its official publication.

Yeshitela stated early on that the mission of the APSP was to "complete the Black Revolution of the Sixties," describing a period of defeat resulting from the counterinsurgency war enacted by the U.S. government against the Black Power movement of the 1960s. Through FBI counterintelligence programs such as COINTELPRO, the U.S. government's counterinsurgency against the Black Revolution of the Sixties involved the assassinations of leaders such as Malcolm X, Martin Luther King, Jr., Bobby Hutton, and Fred Hampton and the destruction of their organizations. Yeshitela was also arrested and jailed numerous times.

The APSP adopted its Constitution at its First Congress held in Oakland, California in 1981.

1982 World Tribunal on Reparations 
The Working Platform of the African People’s Socialist Party was adopted on September 23, 1979.  Of the 14-Points in the platform, the APSP forwarded the demand for Reparations.  For the APSP and the African Internationalists, reparations has been described as a revolutionary demand.  The APSP position on reparations is encompassed in Point 11 of The Working Platform. 

The Working Platform was revised and adopted, once again, at The First Congress of the African People’s Socialist Party held in Oakland, California in November 1981.  The work that they immediately carried forward coming out of The First Congress included the reparations campaign.  Omali Yeshitela writes that the goal of the African People’s Socialist Party was:[T]o make reparations a household word, we were the ones that popularized the reparations demand in the US.

Prior to the involvement of our Party, the issue of reparations essentially involved efforts to win some kind of legislative or judicial recognition in US courts or by the state or federal government.  There was no real mass involvement.

We recognized that reparations had to become the property of the masses if it was to be a significant political question.Chairman Omali Yeshitela and the APSP organized the first World Tribunal on Reparations to African People in the US on November 13 and 14, 1982 in Brooklyn, New York.  The Tribunal found the United States guilty of stolen labor from African people.  Unlike some understandings of reparations, the APSP and the World Tribunal did not stop its analysis at colonial enslavement but instead brought it to the contemporary time.  The Tribunal quantified the debt owed to African people in the US was $4.1 trillion.  This amount was laid out the book Stolen Black Labor:  The Political Economy of Domestic Colonialism.  The proceedings of the World Tribunal were published in the book Reparations Now!:  Abbreviated report of the International Tribunal on Reparations for Black People in the US.

Electoral Politics
In his civic activism in his native St. Petersburg, Yeshitela has stressed his view that political and economic development will bring an end to the oppression of African communities throughout the world. He moved to Oakland, California in 1981, living and working there.

Yeshitela served on St. Petersburg Mayor David Fischer's Challenge 2001 Steering Committee and on the St. Petersburg Housing Authority's Hope VI Advisory Committee, two projects dedicated to attracting jobs and investment to South St. Petersburg. He has also chaired the political action committee of the Coalition of African American Leadership, made up of a number of black churches and civil rights groups in the area, and served on the board of radio station WMNF community radio. Along with eight other candidates, Yeshitela made a run for mayorship in February 2001. Although he did not make it to the runoff, he won every African-American and mixed precinct but one in the entire city.

Yeshitela is also the founder of Citizens United for a Shared Prosperity.

Uhuru movement
 
The Uhuru Movement refers to a group of organizations under the principle of "African internationalism," or the liberation of Africans in both the continent of Africa and in the African Diaspora. 'Uhuru' is a Swahili word for freedom. The Movement is led by Yeshitela's African People's Socialist Party (APSP).

The APSP has formed several organizations, each with specific tasks and purpose. Affiliated organizations include The International People's Democratic Uhuru Movement, African Socialist International, African People's Solidarity Committee, and Burning Spear Media, the African People's Education and Defense fund and the All African People's Development and Empowerment Project.

In May 1972, after his release from prison, Yeshitela founded the African People's Socialist Party (APSP), a political party founded on an ideology combining black nationalism and socialism called "African internationalism." Yeshitela later set up an organization for white people to join in solidarity with the APSP's goals, the African People's Solidarity Committee.

Later, the APSP formed the International People's Democratic Uhuru Movement (InPDUM) to work under the guiding principle that the only way for Africans to achieve liberation and self-determination is to struggle for an all-African socialist government under the leadership of African workers and poor peasants.

Yeshitela has also established the African People's Education and Defense Fund, which seeks to address disparities in education and health faced by African Africans, and Burning Spear Productions, the publishing arm of the APSP.

The APSP is affiliated with the African Socialist International, an organization Yeshitela helped establish that seeks to unite African socialists and national liberation movements under a single revolutionary umbrella in opposition to imperialism and neocolonialism.

He calls for reparations for the black community. Yeshitela has set up a coalition promoting "reparations for the centuries of genocide, oppression and the enslavement" of African people.  Omali Yeshitela has argued that African people worldwide are due reparations for more than slavery, but also over 500 years of colonialism and neocolonialism.

Influence
 Excerpts of a Yeshitela speech are played in multiple tracks of the album Let's Get Free by the hip-hop duo Dead Prez.
 Excerpts of a Yeshitela speech are also played in the Chris Fuller feature film Loren Cass.
 Excerpts of a Yeshitela speech are also played in  星星之火 (A Single Spark) by the Chinese-American rapper Zhong Xiangyu.
 An excerpt of a Yeshitela speech is once more played in the movie Loren Cass, focused on the effects of the 1996 shooting of TyRon Lewis in St. Petersburg.
 Benny the Butcher used an excerpt of Sanyika Shakur reciting a Yeshitela speech as the opening track on his 2019 EP The Plugs I Met
 Omali Yeshitela participated in the Oxford Union’s Africa Debate entitled: “ This House Would Embrace an Ever Closer African Union.”  The Oxford Union video on YouTube has been viewed by more than 1.54 million people.

Publications
Self-published with Burning Spear Uhuru Publications / African People's Socialist Party:
 On African Internationalism (1978)
 Tactics and Strategy for Black Liberation in the US, 1978
 The Struggle for Bread, Peace and Black Power, 1981
 Stolen Black Labor, 1982
 Reparations Now!, 1983
 A New Beginning and Not One Step Backwards,1984 
 The Road to Socialism is Painted Black,  1987 
 Izwe Lethu i Afrika! (Africa Is Our Land) (1991)
 Social Justice and Economic Development for the African Community: Why I became a Revolutionary (1997)
 The Dialectics of Black Revolution: The Struggle to Defeat the Counterinsurgency in the U.S. (1997)
 Overturning the Culture of Violence, by Penny Hess and Omali Yeshitela, 2000
 One Africa! One Nation! (2006), 
 Omali Yeshitela Speaks: African Internationalism, Political Theory for our Time (2005) 
 One People! One Party! One Destiny!, 2010
 An Uneasy Equilibrium: The African Revolution Versus Parasitic Capitalism, 2014
 Vanguard: The Advanced Detachment of the African Revolution, 2018

See also
 African socialism
 Civil Rights Movement
 Uhuru Movement
 Ujamaa
 Black Power
 African Internationalism
 The Burning Spear Newspaper

References

Bibliography
 Enhancing Police Integrity, by Carl B. Klockars, Sanja Kutnjak Ivković, Maria R. Haberfeld, 2006.
 "Uhuru Are You? Meet the little-known black power group behind a well-known institution", by Tom Dreisbach, Philadelphia Citypaper, August 12, 2009.
 "Officials in St. Petersburg Call Racial Unrest 'Calculated'", by Mireya Navarro, New York Times, November 15, 1996.
 "Effort to Heal Old Racial Wounds Brings New Discord", by Rick Bragg, New York Times, July 3, 1999.

External links
 Official Website of African Socialist International
 APSP Website
 Dead Prez Lets Get Free, a Dead Prez album featuring recordings of Omali Yeshitela.
 International People's Democratic Uhuru Movement
 Uhuru Africa Club
 Uhuru Movement
 Burning Spear Uhuru Publications

1941 births
People from St. Petersburg, Florida
20th-century African-American politicians
20th-century American politicians
American socialists
American pan-Africanists
African and Black nationalism in the United States
Living people
Activists from Florida
Activists from Oakland, California
American reparationists
21st-century African-American politicians
21st-century American politicians